The French Forces in Berlin were the units of the French Armed Forces stationed since 1945 until the end of the Cold War-era in West Berlin according to the agreements of the Yalta Conference and Potsdam Conference. The troops were the French counterparts to the United States' Berlin Brigade and the United Kingdom's Berlin Infantry Brigade in the city.

History 

By agreement of the Allies, Berlin was divided into four sectors after the unconditional surrender on May 8, 1945. The allied powers of France, the Soviet Union, the United Kingdom and the United States of America were each granted control of a sector, with permission to station troops there.

The first contingent of french forces, from the 1st Armored Division, arrived in Berlin on July 3, 1945. They were led by General de Beauchesne and occupied Camp Cyclop in the district of Reinickendorf.

After the withdrawal of the Soviet Union from the Allied Control Council and the start of the Berlin Crisis in 1961, units from the other three countries were ordered to protect West Berlin against Soviet troops and against the GDR's own National People's Army (NVA) troops, since the Federal Republic of Germany was not allowed to station Bundeswehr units in Berlin. The French Army first stationed troops in Berlin in 1947. Their headquarters were called Quartier Napoléon.

After the end of the Cold War and the Two Plus Four Agreement, all Allied troops left Berlin in July 1994.

Units

Combat Units

 11e Régiment de Chasseurs (11e RCh) (40x AMX-30B, 2x AMX-30D)
 46e Régiment d'Infanterie (46e RI) (70x VAB)
 110e Compagnie du Génie (110e CG)
 Centre Entrainement de Commando (CEC No 10)

Support Units
 11ème Compagnie de Transmission
 Gendarmerie Berlin
 Hôpital Louis Pasteur
 Base Aérienne 165 Berlin Tegel (1x Max Holste MH1521 Broussard -1988,1x DHC-6-300 Twin Otter 1988-1994) 
 Groupement de Soutien
 Quartier Général
 Direction des Transport et de la Circulation de Berlin (TMFB – Train Militaire Français de Berlin)
 État-Major
 Détachement de l'Aviation Légère de l'Armée de Terre (DETALAT) (2x Cessna O-1 Bird Dog 1968-1993, 2x Sud-Ouest Alouette III 1987-1994)

Subordinate Unit
  Mission Militaire Française de Liaison- MMFL in Potsdam

References

External links

Military units and formations of France
West Berlin
Allied occupation of Germany
Military units and formations established in 1947
Military units and formations disestablished in the 1990s